Major General Wafiq Jizzini (also spelled Wafic Jezzini or Wafik Jezzini; 4 December 1951 – 4 March 2011) was the general director of the General Directorate of General Security of Lebanon from 2005 to 2010.

Career 
Jizzini was born on December 4, 1951, in Beirut. He joined the Lebanese Army Military Academy on October 1, 1973. Major General Wafiq Jizzini took command of several sensitive positions in the Lebanese Army.

The last position in the army was director of the Office of the Army Commander Michel Suleiman, before becoming the general director of the Lebanese General Directorate of General Security on July 4, 2005; succeeding the strong leadership of Major General (P.S.C.) Jamil Al Sayyed where this Directorate has been renowned by the United Nations as the "Best Administration of the year 2004" in the Middle East during Jamil Al Sayyed era.  On December 4, 2010, Jizzini reached the retirement age of 59. This was the end of his military life.

Personal life 
Jizzini was married to Aida Nassar and has one daughter and three sons.

Death 
Jizzini showed symptoms of pancreatic tumor months before retirement. He died three months after retirement on March 4, 2011, in a hospital in Germany while taking treatment.

References 

20th-century Lebanese military personnel
1951 births
2011 deaths
Lebanese Shia Muslims
Directors of the General Directorate of General Security
Deaths from cancer in Germany
Deaths from pancreatic cancer
21st-century Lebanese military personnel
Lebanese major generals